The Litchfield spotted gecko (Gehyra paranana) is a species of gecko in the genus Gehyra. It is endemic to the Northern Territory in Australia.

References

Gehyra
Reptiles described in 2018
Geckos of Australia